Malabar Hill Club (formerly WIAA Club ) is a sports club based in Mumbai, India. Membership at the club is limited and is difficult to procure.

References

Sports clubs in Mumbai
Year of establishment missing